Lateral  is a geometric term of location which may refer to:

Healthcare
Lateral (anatomy), an anatomical direction 
Lateral cricoarytenoid muscle
Lateral release (surgery), a surgical procedure on the side of a kneecap

Phonetics
Lateral consonant, an l-like consonant in which air flows along the sides of the tongue
Lateral release (phonetics), the release of a plosive consonant into a lateral consonant

Other uses
Lateral, journal of the Cultural Studies Association
Lateral canal, a canal built beside another stream
Lateral hiring, recruiting that targets employees of another organization
Lateral mark, a sea mark used in maritime pilotage to indicate the edge of a channel
Lateral stability of aircraft during flight
Lateral pass, a type of pass in American and Canadian football
Lateral support (disambiguation), various meanings
Lateral thinking, the solution of problems through an indirect and creative approach
Lateral number, a proposed alternate term for imaginary number

See also
Bilateral (disambiguation)

Latitude